Eradu Rekhegalu is a 1984 Indian Kannada-language drama film, directed by K. Balachander. The film stars Saritha, Srinath and Geetha. Produced by Chandulal Jain, the film is a remake of 1969 Tamil hit Iru Kodugal. The music was composed by M. S. Viswanathan.

The story revolves around a man who circumstantially gets to marry two women and faces  an emotional roller-coaster. The film was made in Telugu as Collector Janaki and in Hindi as Sanjog.

Cast
Saritha
Srinath
 Geetha
K. S. Ashwath
 Lokanath
 Uma Shivakumar
 N. S. Rao
 Shivaram
 Sadashiva Brahmavar

Soundtrack

References

External sources

1984 films
1980s Kannada-language films
Films directed by K. Balachander
Kannada remakes of Tamil films
Films scored by M. S. Viswanathan
Films with screenplays by K. Balachander